The Swedish Board of Mines was a government agency in Sweden that worked between 1637 and 1857 with the task of guiding and controlling the mining industry and metal processing in Sweden. In 1857, it became part of the National Board of Trade.

See also 

 Vuorineuvos – title of mining councilor (Swedish )

References

Further reading 

Defunct government agencies of Sweden
Economic history of Sweden